The Argus was an Australian daily morning newspaper in Melbourne from 2 June 1846 to 19 January 1957, and was considered to be the general Australian newspaper of record for this period. Widely known as a conservative newspaper for most of its history, it adopted a left-leaning approach from 1949. The Arguss main competitor was David Syme's more liberal-minded newspaper, The Age.

History

The newspaper was originally owned by William Kerr, who was also Melbourne's town clerk from 1851–1856 and had been a journalist at the Sydney Gazette before moving to Melbourne in 1839 to work on John Pascoe Fawkner's newspaper, the Port Phillip Patriot.

The first edition was published on 2 June 1846. The paper soon became known for its scurrilous abuse and sarcasm, and by 1853, after he had lost a series of libel lawsuits, Kerr was forced to sell the paper's ownership to avoid financial ruin. The paper was then published by Edward Wilson. By 1855, it had a daily circulation of 13,000.

In October 1881, an afternoon edition was launched, the Evening Mail, edited by Henry Short, but this was a failure, and ceased publication in August 1882.
In 1883, newspaper editor and owner Richard Twopeny (1857–1919) regarded The Argus as "the best daily paper published out of England". The paper become a stablemate to the weekly The Australasian, which became the Australasian Post in 1946. 

During the Depression, in 1933, it launched the Melbourne Evening Star in competition with The Herald newspaper of the Herald and Weekly Times Ltd, but ended the venture in 1936 due to poor circulation figures.

The company's newspaper operations experienced severe financial losses from 1939 onwards, which would continue through the 1940s and the 1950s due to economic turmoil, increased costs of newsprint, and cut-throat competition for newspaper circulation in Melbourne.

In June 1949, The Argus was acquired by the London-based Daily Mirror newspaper group and, on 28 July 1952, it became the first newspaper in the world to publish colour photographs in a daily paper. The paper also had interests in radio and, from 1956, the new medium of television, being part of the consortium General Telecasters Victoria (GTV) and its television station GTV-9 (now part of the Nine Network).

On 19 January 1957, after 110 years, seven months and 17 days, The Argus printed its final edition. The paper was discontinued and sold to the Herald and Weekly Times group (HWT), which undertook to re-employ Argus staff and continue publication of selected features, and also made an allocation of shares to the UK owners. The company's other print and broadcasting operations were unaffected.

Notable editors and writers
 Julian Howard Ashton (1877–1964), English-born journalist, writer and critic
 Hugh Buggy (1896–1974), journalist/football writer
Edward S. Cunningham (1859–1957), editor 1906–1928
 Roy Curthoys (1892–1971), editor 1929–1935
 Frances Fitzgerald Elmes (1867–1919), English-born feminist journalist
 Frederick William Haddon, (1839–1906), English-Australian sub-editor in 1863, editor 1867–1898
 Andrew Murray, editor in 1855 and 1856
 Charles Patrick Smith (1877-1963), journalist
 Edward Oxford (1822-1900), writer and attempted assassin of Queen Victoria.
 James Smith
 David Watterston
 Howard Willoughby
 Edward Wilson
 Theodosia Ada Wallace, starting about 1892 she wrote a social column under the name 'Biddy B.A.'
 Arnold Shore, art critic
 Frank Doherty, theatre critic

See also 
 List of newspapers in Australia
 Argus Building
 Argus finals system, a series of systems for determining the premiers of the Victorian Football League and other Australian rules football competitions in the early 20th century
 Australasian Sketcher with Pen and Pencil

Further reading
 Don Hauser: The Printers of the Streets and Lanes of Melbourne (1837–1975), Nondescript Press, Melbourne 2006
 Jim Usher (ed): The Argus – life and death of a newspaper, Australian Scholarly Publishing, Melbourne 2008

References

External links 
 
 
 The Argus: Special War Edition – 1 May 1915
 Digitised World War I Victorian newspapers from the State Library of Victoria

Publications established in 1846
Publications disestablished in 1957
Defunct newspapers published in Melbourne
1846 establishments in Australia
1957 disestablishments in Australia
Daily newspapers published in Australia
Newspapers on Trove